40 Minutes was a BBC TV documentary strand broadcast on BBC Two between 1981 and 1994.

Some documentaries in the original series were revisited and updated in a 2006 version, Forty Minutes On.

See also
 Sixty Minutes (British TV programme)

References

BBC television documentaries
1981 British television series debuts
1994 British television series endings
1980s British documentary television series
1990s British documentary television series
English-language television shows